Harmony School, School District #53, built in 1879, is an historic Carpenter Gothic-style country one-room schoolhouse located in rural Otoe County, Nebraska, near Nebraska City. The building was used for its intended purpose until 1997 when it was closed. It is now privately owned.

On July 22, 2005, Harmony School was added to the National Register of Historic Places.

References

School buildings on the National Register of Historic Places in Nebraska
Carpenter Gothic architecture in Nebraska
School buildings completed in 1879
Schools in Otoe County, Nebraska
National Register of Historic Places in Otoe County, Nebraska